The 29th New Brunswick Legislative Assembly represented New Brunswick between February 13, 1896, and January 26, 1899.

John James Fraser served as Lieutenant-Governor of New Brunswick until November 1896 when he was succeeded by Abner Reid McClelan.

J.P. Burchill was chosen as speaker.

The Liberal Party led by Andrew G. Blair formed the government. James Mitchell became party leader in 1896 when Blair left provincial politics. Mitchell retired due to poor health in 1897 and was replaced by Henry Emmerson.

History

Members 

Notes:

References 
The Canadian parliamentary companion, 1897, JA Gemmill

Terms of the New Brunswick Legislature
1896 establishments in New Brunswick
1899 disestablishments in New Brunswick
19th century in New Brunswick